Isma'il Sirri Pasha (1861 - 1937) was an Egyptian engineer and politician. He was Minister of both Public Works and Defence in nine governments between 1908 and 1926.

Career
Ismail Sirri was born in the province of Al-Minya. He graduated with a diploma in engineering from Paris in 1878, and trained in London. He translated books from English and French. He died in Cairo. His son Hussein Serry Pasha was also a notable politician.

Published Works
 Riyad al-Anfus fi Tizkar al-Muhandis.
 Al-'Ilm al-Nafees bi al-Fayyum wa Buhayrat Muris (1889). Translation of Robert Hanbury Brown, The Fayûm and Lake Mœris (London, E. Stanford, 1892). Translated from English to Arabic by Isma'il Sirri.
 Al-Durar al-Bahiyya (1883). Translated from French to Arabic by Isma'il Sirri.

References

External links
 Ministry of Public Works biography (in Arabic)

Defence Ministers of Egypt
Egyptian pashas
19th-century Egyptian people
1861 births
Irrigation Ministers of Egypt
1937 deaths